RP 1, RP-1, RP.1, RP1, or variant may refer to:

 RP-1, Rocket Propellant 1
 RP1, retinitis pigmentosa 1 protein
 RP1 asteroid
 5580 Sharidake or 1988 RP1, asteroid Sharidake, RP1 from 1998, the 5580th asteroid catalogued
 (12728) 1991 RP1, RP1 from 1991, the 12728th asteroid catalogued
 12576 Oresme or 1999 RP1, asteroid Oresme, RP1 from 1999, the 12576th asteroid catalogued
 Mitsubishi RP-1, helicopter
 Rensselaer RP-1, crewed glider
 Radioplane RP-1, UAV
 Ready Player One, novel by Ernest Cline
 RP1, real projective line

See also
 RPI (disambiguation)
 RPL (disambiguation)